Asaf Romirowsky is a Middle East historian and political commentator. He is the Executive Director of Scholars for Peace in the Middle East (SPME) and the Association for the Study of the Middle East and Africa (ASMEA).

Biography
Asaf Romirowsky received his PhD from King's College London. He is the executive director of Scholars for Peace in the Middle East (SPME).

Trained as a Middle East historian he holds a PhD in Middle East and Mediterranean Studies from King's College London and has published widely on various aspects of the Arab-Israeli conflict and American foreign policy in the Middle East, as well as on Israeli and Zionist history.

Romirowsky is co-author of Religion, Politics, and the Origins of Palestine Refugee Relief and a contributor to The Case Against Academic Boycotts of Israel. Romirowsky's publicly-engaged scholarship has been featured in The Wall Street Journal, The National Interest, The American Interest , The New Republic, The Times of Israel, Jerusalem Post, Ynet and Tablet among other online and print media outlets.

Romirowsky is a critic of Palestinian terrorism.

In late 2007, his invitation to take part in an academic panel at the University of Delaware was rescinded by student organizers after another member of the panel, political science professor Muqtedar Khan, objected to sharing a podium with a former Israeli soldier.

 UNRWA and Palestinian refugees Religion, Politics, and the Origins of Palestine Refugee Relief'', the 2013 book Romirowsky co-authored with Alexander H. Joffe, examines the origins of the UNRWA in the endorsement by the British authorities in Mandatory Palestine of efforts by the American Friends Service Committee to assist Arab refugees during and after the 1947–1949 Palestine war.  Romirowsky and Joffe argue that the UNRWA's attitude towards Israel is rooted in the "foundational belief" of the American Friends Service Committee "in a supersessionist Christianity that could not reconcile the possibility of a rebirth of Jewish nationhood in the Land of Israel."

Romirowsky believes that UNRWA is an "anomaly within the world of refugee relief" and that it encourages the refugees it cares for towards terrorism and intransigence.

Romirowsky favors limiting the definition of who is a Palestinian refugee so that descendants of those who fled or were expelled by Israel during the 1948 war would not be counted as refugees. Marouf Hasian Jr. criticizes Romirowsky by arguing that he is minimizing the existestential dangers facing the Palestinians by complaining about how UNRWA categorizes refugees. According to him, Romirowsky's message is that "happy and carefree generations of Palestinians don't mind being refugees, and the UNRWA revels in its role as dispenser of aid" which he thinks is false.

References

Sources

External links
 
 Scholars for Peace in the Middle East

Year of birth missing (living people)
Living people
Middle Eastern studies in the United States
Alumni of King's College London